The Island line is one of eleven lines of the MTR, the mass transit system in Hong Kong. It runs from Kennedy Town in Western to Chai Wan in the Eastern District on Hong Kong Island, passing through the territory's major business districts of Central, Wan Chai and Causeway Bay, and connecting them with built-up areas on the north shore of the island. 

The line first opened on 31 May 1985. It travels  in 25 minutes along its route, serving 17 stations. The line is indicated by the colour dark blue on the MTR route map.

History
The Hong Kong government authorised the construction of the -long Island line in December 1980, after rejecting plans to extend the tram to Chai Wan. 

On 31 May 1985 the Island line opened with services operating between Admiralty and Chai Wan stations in six-car trains. The opening ceremony was held at Tai Koo station and was officiated by then-MTR chairman Sir Wilfrid Newton and Governor of Hong Kong Sir Edward Youde, who unveiled the commemorative plaques at the station concourse.

On 23 May 1986, the Island line was extended to Central and Sheung Wan stations. Both Admiralty and Central stations became interchange stations with the Tsuen Wan line. As part of this extension, each train was lengthened to eight cars.

Quarry Bay Congestion Relief 
After the Kwun Tong line was extended to Quarry Bay station through the Eastern Harbour Crossing on 1 October 1989, that station became an interchange station with the Island line, but unlike that at Admiralty, there is no cross-platform arrangement requiring passengers to use two escalators and a long passageway in between to change lines. In a response to the resulting congestion, the government recommended the Quarry Bay Congestion Relief Works project, and decided to expand North Point station to include a second interchange with the Kwun Tong line, with construction starting in July 1998.

The North Point interchange opened on 27 September 2001, and proved to be a much more efficient method of interchanging, as the new station featured cross-platform interchange, reducing the time required to interchange from five minutes at Quarry Bay station to less than one minute. On 4 August 2002, both these stations became interchange stations with the new Tseung Kwan O line which had taken over the harbour crossing section from the Kwun Tong line.

Western extension 

In 2002, the MTRC announced that it would use HK$300 million to construct the West and South Island lines, provided that the Government would award subsidies towards the project. No sooner, in May 2002, the first proposal from the MTRC detailed a western extension of the existing Island line towards Kennedy Town. However the plan was abruptly brought to a halt due to land reclamation obstacles on the western coast of Hong Kong Island, and the enormous cost and uncertainties concerning the Hong Kong Government's subsidies for the project. However, the current plan for the new lines to the Southern District would require parts of the Western extension in order for it to be completed. As a result, the MTR Corporation was conducting extensive surveys as well as public forums to gather opinion and suggestions concerning the alignment of the extension and location of the Sai Ying Pun, Shek Tong Tsui and Kennedy Town stations for the West Island line.

Construction commenced on the Island line's western extension to Kennedy Town in 2009 and on 28 December 2014, the extension opened to passenger services, providing direct heavy rail connection to the western district of Hong Kong Island for the first time. New intermediate stations at Sai Ying Pun and the University of Hong Kong also opened as part of the extension; however, construction delayed the opening of Sai Ying Pun station to 29 March 2015.

Route description
The Island line resembles the deep-level lines of the London Underground, as most of the route and stations along the line are deep underground and consist of cylindrical tunnels. This is the result of a lack of available land, as the construction plans for the line required it to be built under major roads.

Only the segment of the line east of Shau Kei Wan has space for track expansion and thus the line emerges to the surface at Heng Fa Chuen, and then on a viaduct, which runs alongside Shing Tai Road, and which passes over Chai Wan Park and Island Eastern Corridor above ground, all the way to Chai Wan.

The route of the original underground section of the line is also served by Hong Kong Tramways at surface level (the West Island line extension follows its own routing further inland from the tramway). This brought concerns that the tram system might be abolished when the MTR line was to be built, but a decision to save the tramline was made in 1980; and it serves as a backup in the event of service breakdown and a cheaper alternative for shorter journeys.

Because of the depth of the line, most underground stations on this line have curved walls on the platforms, which are due to the route's cylindrical tunnels, only with a greater diameter. Of the underground stations not bearing this feature, Tai Koo station is itself a large tube containing both the concourse and the platform, Sai Ying Pun station and HKU station consists of station boxes that are themselves,  also tube-like though flatter, while Shau Kei Wan, Admiralty, Central and Kennedy Town stations are built using the cut-and-cover method.

Because most stations were built under roads, most of the platforms are curved, resulting in large platform gaps. The few stations where the platforms are otherwise relatively straight are those on the West Island line as well as North Point, Quarry Bay, Tai Koo, Heng Fa Chuen and Chai Wan. Also, due to geographical constraints, the platforms of Wan Chai, Causeway Bay, Tin Hau and Sai Wan Ho are located on two different levels. This also separates the platform and concourse into two parts, so there are some passageways and long escalators on those stations to link between the platform and concourse.

All Island line stations except Heng Fa Chuen and Chai Wan have their Chinese station names written in Chinese calligraphy as part of the stations' livery. A retired architect, Abe Au Kit-tong, involved in the design of the Island line explained that calligraphy are written in large fonts to alleviate the psychological effect caused by the narrow platforms and the curvature of the walls, in addition to remind passengers what this stop is. This explains why Heng Fa Chuen and Chai Wan stations do not have calligraphy forming part of its livery, as they are built above ground rather than underground. This feature is also shared amongst some newer MTR stations such as those on the Tseung Kwan O line and Lam Tin station on the Kwun Tong line.

Gallery

Stations
This is a list of the stations on the Island line.

List

Notes

Future development

A proposal suggests extending the Island line eastward to terminate at a new Siu Sai Wan station.

See also

List of areas of Hong Kong
North Island line
Transport in Hong Kong

References

 
MTR lines
Hong Kong Island
Railway lines opened in 1985
1432 mm gauge railways in Hong Kong
1500 V DC railway electrification